The Billabong Pipe Masters 2019 was the 11th and final event of the Men's Championship Tour in the 2019 World Surf League. It took place from 9 to 19 December at the  Banzai Pipeline in Oahu, Hawaii, and was contested by 36 surfers.

In an all-Brazilian final, Italo Ferreira defeated Gabriel Medina to win the sixth Championship Tour event of his career. The victory also secured a first World Surf League championship for Ferreira.

Format

A new competition format was introduced for the 2019 Championship Tour. All 36 surfers take part in the Seeding Round. The top two surfers in each heat advance directly to the Round of 32, while the lowest-placed surfer in each heat enters the Elimination Round. In each of the four heats in the Elimination Round, the top two surfers advance to the Round of 32, while the lowest-placed surfer is eliminated from the competition. From the Round of 32 onwards, the competition follows a single elimination format, with the winner of each head-to-head heat advancing to the next round and the loser being eliminated.

Competition

The competition took place from 9 to 19 December.

Seeding Round

Elimination round

Round of 32

Round of 16

Quarterfinals

Semifinals

Final

References

External links
 2019 Official event website

2019 World Surf League
Billabong Pipe Masters
2019 in sports in Hawaii
2019 in American sports
December 2019 sports events in the United States